Ndebele language may refer to:

 Northern Ndebele language or Zimbabwean Ndebele, spoken in Zimbabwe
 Southern Ndebele language or Transvaal Ndebele, spoken in South Africa
 Sumayela Ndebele language or Northern Transvaal Ndebele, spoken to the northeast of Southern Ndebele; closer to siSwati

See also
Nguni languages, the language family to which all of the above belong